Bum is a village and municipality in the Qabala Rayon of Azerbaijan.  It has a population of 5,095.  The municipality consists of the villages of Bum, Zərgərli, and Qarasu.

References 

Populated places in Qabala District